Marko Ciciliani (born February 23, 1970) is a composer, audiovisual artist and performer.

Life 
Marko Ciciliani was born in 1970 in Zagreb, Croatia. In 1971 his parents emigrated to Germany where he predominantly grew up in Karlsruhe.

Starting in 1990 he studied composition and music-theory with Ulrich Leyendecker at the Hochschule für Musik und Theater Hamburg. From 1993 to 1994 he spent a year in New York City, studying at the Manhattan School of Music with Nils Vigeland. After returning to Hamburg he continued his studies until his graduation with Manfred Stahnke. In 1996 he emigrated to Amsterdam, Netherlands, where he studied until 1998 as a post-graduate student at the Royal Conservatory of The Hague. His principal teachers during that time were Clarence Barlow and Louis Andriessen.

Ciciliani remained in Amsterdam until 2010, living primarily as a free-lance composer and playing an active role in the Dutch music scene. Since the early 2000 he was also increasingly active as a sound-engineer and performer of electronic music. He performed with many leading ensembles and orchestras, such as the Royal Concertgebouw Orchestra, Melbourne Symphony Orchestra or the SWR Orchestra, as well as MusikFabrik and ASKO.

In 2007 Ciciliani started a PhD at the Brunel University London under supervision of Bob Gilmore and Johannes Birringer. He completed his doctorate studies in 2010 with a thesis on interrelationships between visual media and music, specifically in the context of using light designs as part of compositions.
In 2010 he moved to Austria, taking up a teaching position at the University of Music and Performing Arts, Vienna. In 2011 he became guest-professor at the Institute of Electronic Music and Acoustics (IEM) of the University of Music and Performing Arts Graz. In October 2014 he was appointed full professor for computer music composition and sound design at the IEM.

Work

Open Form Period 
Already in his early works Ciciliani showed a fascination for works of open forms which formed the center of his works from 1999. This interest was partly fed by his fascination for the music of John Cage which was one of the reasons why he went to study in New York City with Nils Vigeland – a former close collaborator of Cage.
In order to be able to extend open form and algorithmic principles to the realm of electronic sound synthesis, he started using SuperCollider in 2001. His open form period culminated with the live-installation "Map of Marble" which was premiered at the Zagreb Biennale in 2005 
Also in 2005 he released the CD "Voor het Hooren Geboren" containing open form chamber music played by ensemble Intégrales.

Improvisation and No-input Mixer 
From 2000 Ciciliani started experimenting with electronic improvisation. Between 2001 and 2005 he co-organized the concert series Kraakgeluiden in Amsterdam with Anne LaBerge. This weekly series featured electronic improvised music and became an important center for the experimental music scene in the Netherlands.
 
As an instrument for improvisation Ciciliani used a no-input mixer, a mixing board in which internal feedbacks are generated by connecting the outputs to the inputs. In 2008 he released the CD "81 matters in elemental order" which was entirely produced and composed with the no-input mixer. Shortly after this release he stopped performing with the no-input mixer.

Audiovisual Works 
Ciciliani started to work with lighting as an important part of his compositions in 2003. This became one of his main areas of interest which also led to his dissertation at Brunel University in 2010. In 2005 he founded his own ensemble “Bakin Zub”, which focussed on multimedia works which combine instrumental parts, live-electronics and visuals. Bakin Zub's last public appearance was in 2014, when it premiered Ciciliani's program-length work "Suicidal Self Portraits" at the festival Forum Neuer Musik Deutschlandfunk in Cologne.

More recently, Ciciliani has primarily worked with live-video in his audiovisual works, as for example in his solo compositions "Via" or "Formula minus One". After having realized two works using laser in 2007 and 2009, he used this medium again in his "Steina" for violin, live-electronics, live-video and laser.

In 2015 Ciciliani produced a book titled "Pop Wall Alphabet". It is a transmedia work combining 4.5 hours of music (included as a DVD with the book), roughly 300 pages of digitally generated texts and 27 images. The work is based on condensations of material from publications of pop music, be it as superimpositions of songs, rearranged texts or combined artworks as images. The music was described a "monlythic verticalisation of sound". The focus of this work is a study of perception and acoustic pareidolias.

In 2019 Ciciliani's most recent publication was released by ChampDAction in Antwerp titled "Transgressions". It consist of a book with an integrated USB stick that contains four audiovisual compositions. Furthermore, the book contains a reprint of his text "Music in the Expanded Field – on recent Approaches in Interdisciplinary Composition", which is based on a lecture he gave at the Darmstadt Summer Courses in 2016.

Game-based compositions 
In 2015, Ciciliani has been granted a PEEK project by the Austrian Science Fund with the title "GAPPP – Gamified Audiovisual Performance and Performance Practice" (AR 364). It was an artistic research project that ran from 2016-21, and in which together with violinist and researcher Barbara Lüneburg and musicologist Andreas Pirchner, Ciciliani investigated elements from computer games in the context of audiovisual composition and performance for their aesthetic potential. With this project Ciciliani deepened his interest in either overtly referencing game culture - as in his composition "Kilgore" -  or integrating competitive and/or interactive elements from computer games in subtle ways - as in the project "Tympanic Touch". The interest for computer game elements can be found in his work since "Homo Ludens", composed in 2013 for the Ensemble des XX. Jahrhunderts.
Through the work with game-elements he is returning to principles of composition that he already thoroughly explored in his numerous open form compositions from the early 2000.

The research concluded with the publication of the multimedia book "LUDIFIED", which includes a USB-stick with more than four hours of video-material, and downloadable apps for the experience of augmented reality with certain images in the book. It has been published by TheGreenBox in Berlin.

Performances, Residencies and Teaching activities 
Ciciliani's music has been performed in more than 45 countries in Europe, Asia, Oceania and the Americas. It has been programmed by festivals and concert series of alternative experimental music like Experimental Intermedia/NYC, Club Transmediale/Berlin, SuperDeluxe/Tokyo, Findars/Kuala Lumpur, Ibrasotope/São Paulo or the NowNow Series/Sydney; just as much as by festivals for post-avantgarde music as Donaueschinger Musiktage, Wien Modern, Huddersfield Contemporary Music Festival, MaerzMusik, Condit and many more.

His music has been performed by high ranking ensembles like ICTUS ensemble, ensemble Intégrales, ASKO, Zeitkratzer, piano possible and many more. In his recent work, however, Ciciliani has focused on works for smaller settings, solo works and works for live-electronics alone. He also regularly performs with a repertoire of audiovisual solo compositions.

In 2009 Marko Ciciliani was recipient of the prestigious Villa Aurora Stipend, a three-month artists residency in Los Angeles. Also in 2009 he was composer-in-residence of the 14th Composers Forum in Mittersill/Austria. He received numerous project-residencies at STEIM, ESS, ICST and ZKM. 
In 2014 Ciciliani has taught at the Darmstadt International Summer Courses for New Music where he also presented a portrait concert. This invitation took place as part of the IEM's studio residency at the Summer Courses. In 2016 he has also been invited individually as teacher to the Darmstadt International Summer Courses for New Music, where he offered individual lessons and a.o. a workshop on audiovisual composition, titled "Music in the Expanded Field". He returned to Darmstadt as tutor in 2018.

Since 2013 Ciciliani has regularly participated at the interdisciplinary course LAbO in Antwerp, which is organized by ChampDAction  He was Artistic Director of this summer course in the seasons 2017, 2020 and 2021.

Research 
Ciciliani has various publications in the field of performance studies and audiovisuality. He has developed a method for the analysis of performance practices in electronic music. Here performance is understood as an audiovisual event which becomes part of the presented work and therefore gains aesthetic relevance. With this method the analysis of a particular performance practice results in a graph on a parametric field, which facilitates the comparison of different performance practices with each other.

To regard performance as an audiovisual event is in line with Ciciliani's longer lasting research in the field of audiovisuality which has resulted in his dissertation and other publications.

Many publications have resulted from the artistic research project "GAPPP – Gamified Audiovisual Performance and Performance Practice" (AR 364) that Ciciliani is leading since 2016.

Selected works
 miris misli for large orchestra 1994   ~ 20' 
 Starring: Peater Mallet for three percussionists 1994/95   ~ 40'
 k: die S.kalierung einer Bewegung – Tek...kno   for singer/narrator and live-electronics 1995   ~ 11’ 
 Bosch tapped the gas pedal and the caprice moved forward... for two performers and live-electronics (collaboration with Jeff Kowalkowski)   1996–2000   ~70’ 
 Tullius Rooms for piano, live-electronics and soundscapes 1999/2000 ~80' 
 Fabric Reverie for chamber orchestra, CD and a reciting conductor 2000 ~15' 
 Homerun for alto and 8 instruments (rec., cl., trb., pno., perc., el.-guit., vln., db.), 5 movements 2001   20' 
 Matrosen, Leprakranke, Opiumraucher, Spione. Mit so 'ner Familiengeschichte, wie haben wir da was anderes werden können als Schlampen? for viola 2001     20'
 Maske for no-input mixer 2002   ~30’ 
 KörperKlang for viola, alto-sax, piano and live-electronics 2003   ~13’
 Just because you're not paranoid doesn't mean that they're not after you for solo-violin, large ensemble, live-electronics and light 2003   ~15’
 Sequenced Seizure for string quartet ~30'   2004
 Map of Marble for voice, percussion, live-electronics and computer generated lighting ~80'   2004/2005
 My Ultadeep I for e-guitar, e-bass, vln/vla, sopranino sax, didjeridu, perc., electronics and light ~65'   2006/2007
 Alias for e-violin, electronics, light and laser ~20'   2007
 Jeanne of the Dark for electric guitar/bass, electric vln., perc., live-electronics, video and lighting ~60’     2008 
 Dromomania for two pianos, live-electronics, soundtracks and lighting ~40’   2009 
 Black Horizon for two table-top guitars and four players ~21’   2009
 All of Yesterday’s Parties for voice, electric guitar and live-electronics   ~12’   2010
 Pop Wall Alphabet for soundtracks   ~4 hours and 30 minutes   2011–14
 Heterotopolis for violin, baritone guitar/6-string fretless bass, modular synthesizer, digital synthesis, live-electronics, lighting and laser 	(collaboration with visual artist Marcel Bühler)   ~55’   2011/12
 Time Machine for sensor-equipped bass-clarinet (SABRe), live-electronics, live-video and lighting 16'   2012/13
 LipsEarsAssNoseBoobs (Gloomy Sunday) for electric violin, percussion, keyboards, live-electronics and video ~14’   2014
 Formula minus One for electric violin, live-electronics and live video ~10' 2014
 Via for live-electronics and live-video ~14’ 2015
 Steina for violin, live-electronics and live-generated video and laser design ~28’ 2015
 Audiodromo for four percussionists, live-electronics and live-video ~10’ 2016
 Tympanic Touch for two performers and a game-system 15' 2017
 Kilgore for two performers and a game-system 25' 2018
 Kilgore's Resort installation 2018
 Anna & Marie concert installation, electric violin, baroque violin, live-electronics, two live-videos, augmented reality and light-design, indeterminate duration 2018/19
 Rave Séance performance installation, indeterminate duration 2020

CD, DVD and book releases

Full Releases 
 Bosch tapped the gas pedal and the Caprice moved forward… (62:28), 2001, collaboration with Jeff Kowalkowski, released by NoHarmDone/NYC
 Tullius Rooms for piano, electronics and soundscapes (78:27), 2003, piano: Josh Dillon, electronics and inside piano: Marko Ciciliani, released by Unsounds/Amsterdam in coproduction with RadioBremen 
 Voor het hooren geboren (71:24), 2006, five chamber-musical works performed by ensemble Intégrales, released by Coviello Classics/Darmstadt 
 81 Matters in elemental Order (58:46), 2008, for no-input mixer, released by Evil Rabbit Records/Amsterdam 
 Jeanne of the Dark (49:21), 2011, for electric violin, electric guitar, electric bass, keyboards, electronics and percussion, released by Ahornfelder/Hamburg
 Pop Wall Alphabet (approx. 270'), 2015, a book containing a DVD, 311 pages with 27 color images, private print for promotion only
 Transgressions (approx. 67'), 2019, a book with integrated USB stick containing audiovisual works, 74 pages, released by ChampDAction/Antwerp
 LUDIFIED (approx. 120'), 2021, multimedia book with integrated USB stick containing audiovisual works, 248 pages, released by TheGreenBox/Berlin

Compilations 
 Kraakgeluiden/Document 1 (2003) released by Unsounds/Amsterdam, contains improvisation with Yannis Kyriakides, Lucio Capece and Yoshio Machida (9:57)
 Music for Baby (2004) released by Amorfon/Tokyo, contains Pavillion for string ensemble (5:12)
 Young European Generation (2005) released by Zeitklang/Berlin, contains KörperKlang for viola, alto sax, piano and live electronics  (12:13) ensemble Intégrales
 Jorge Isaac Solo (2007)released by Electroshock Recordings, Moscow, contains Quartz Stalagnat for recorder and electronics (18:15) performed by Jorge Isaac
 Test Tone Anthology (2009) released by: Medama Records, Tokyo, contains improvisation with Yoshio Machida (7:12)
 Kofomi #14 (2010), released by ein–klang records, Vienna, contains Zwischenraumstudie for flute, clarinet, viola and cello (5:34)
 Anthology of Dutch Musik (2011) released by MuziekCentrum NL, Amsterdam, contains an excerpt from the 80 minute composition Map of Marble (6:39)
 Weapon of Choice (2011) released by Ahornfelder, Hamburg, DVD, contains Alias for electric violin, live-electronics, lighting and laser (20:41) performed by Barbara Lüneburg
 Etude Gone Badum (2013) released by Ahornfelder, Hamburg, contains Black Horizon for two table-top guitars and four players (21:32) played by Håkon Stene and Marko Ciciliani
 Reciprocity – Nico Couck (2013) released by Champ d'Action, Antwerp, contains All of Yesterday's Parties for voice, electric guitar and live electronics (12:27) played by Nico Couck
 Palavras e Sons (2015) released by NMElindo, São Paulo, contains Dromomania (job of dying's done) for electronics (9:34)

References

External links
 Official Website
 Audiovisual Works
 Works on SoundCloud
 Academic Publications

1970 births
Living people
Croatian composers
Performance artists